Thomas Phillips Mill Complex is a historic mill complex located at Newark in New Castle County, Delaware.  The complex includes a late 18th-century mill owner's house, a circa mid-19th-century miller's house, and a grist mill that was initially constructed in 1795.  The mill is a banked, -story, gable-roofed building that is constructed of uncoursed rubble fieldstone at its basement and first floor levels, and of weatherboarded frame at its second story and attic levels.

It was added to the National Register of Historic Places in 1983.

References

External links
History of Thomas Phillips Mill

Grinding mills on the National Register of Historic Places in Delaware
Grinding mills in Delaware
Buildings and structures in Newark, Delaware
National Register of Historic Places in New Castle County, Delaware